Howard County is a county located in the U.S. state of Arkansas. As of the 2020 census, the population was 12,785. The county seat is Nashville. Howard County is Arkansas's 74th county, formed on April 17, 1873, and named for James Howard, a state senator. It is a dry county.

Geography

Major highways
 U.S. Highway 70
 U.S. Highway 278
 U.S. Highway 371
 Highway 26
 Highway 27
 Highway 84

Adjacent counties
Polk County (north)
Pike County (east)
Hempstead County (southeast)
Little River County (southwest)
Sevier County (west)

National protected area
 Ouachita National Forest (part)

Demographics

2020 census

As of the 2020 United States census, there were 12,785 people, 5,142 households, and 3,503 families residing in the county.

2000 census
As of the 2000 census, there were 14,300 people, 5,471 households, and 3,922 families residing in the county.  The population density was 24 people per square mile (9/km2).  There were 6,297 housing units at an average density of 11 per square mile (4/km2).  The racial makeup of the county was 73.60% White, 21.86% Black or African American, 0.41% Native American, 0.50% Asian, 0.01% Pacific Islander, 2.76% from other races, and 0.86% from two or more races.  5.08% of the population were Hispanic or Latino of any race. 4.75% reported speaking Spanish at home, while 1.73% speak German.

There were 5,471 households, out of which 34.10% had children under the age of 18 living with them, 55.20% were married couples living together, 12.70% had a female householder with no husband present, and 28.30% were non-families. 25.70% of all households were made up of individuals, and 12.60% had someone living alone who was 65 years of age or older.  The average household size was 2.55 and the average family size was 3.04.

In the county, the population was spread out, with 26.90% under the age of 18, 8.60% from 18 to 24, 27.80% from 25 to 44, 21.60% from 45 to 64, and 15.10% who were 65 years of age or older.  The median age was 36 years. For every 100 females there were 95.10 males.  For every 100 females age 18 and over, there were 91.20 males.

The median income for a household in the county was $28,699, and the median income for a family was $34,510. Males had a median income of $28,086 versus $17,266 for females. The per capita income for the county was $15,586.  About 11.90% of families and 15.50% of the population were below the poverty line, including 20.10% of those under age 18 and 17.00% of those age 65 or over.

Government
Over the past few election cycles, Howard County has trended heavily towards the GOP. The last Democratic presidential candidate (as of 2020) to carry this county was Bill Clinton in 1996.

Communities

Cities
Dierks
Mineral Springs
Nashville (county seat)

Towns
Tollette

Census-designated places
Center Point
Saratoga

Other unincorporated communities
 Athens
 Corinth
 Midway
 Mineola
 Okay
 Perkins
 Schaal
 Umpire

Historic communities
Allbrook
Antimony
Baker Springs
Carl
Cowling
Dial
Eldridge
Euclid
Galena
Henry
Howe
Markham
Martha
Minnie
New Moon
Pates
Picayune
Rosadale

Townships

 Blackland
 Blue Bayou
 Blue Ridge
 Brewer
 Buck Range
 Burg
 Center Point
 Clay
 County Line
 Dillard
 Duckett
 Franklin
 Holly Creek
 Madison (Dierks)
 Mineral Springs (Mineral Springs)
 Mountain
 Muddy Fork
 Nashville (Nashville)
 Saline
 Saratoga
 Tollette (Tollette) --- township completely inside Blackland Township
 Umpire

See also
 List of lakes in Howard County, Arkansas
 National Register of Historic Places listings in Howard County, Arkansas

References

 
1873 establishments in Arkansas
Populated places established in 1873